Goneaway is a national park in Central West Queensland, Australia, 1158 km west of Brisbane.

The park is a habitat for 17 species of plants and 55 species of animals. The elevation of the terrain is 215 meters.

See also

 Protected areas of Queensland

References 

National parks of Queensland
Protected areas established in 1994
Central West Queensland